David Swerdlick is an American journalist who works for The Washington Post.

Biography
Swerdlick was born in Brooklyn but was raised in the San Francisco Bay area. His father is Jewish and his mother is African American. He graduated with a B.A from U.C. Berkeley and with a J.D. from the University of North Carolina Law School. After school he worked as an associate editor for The Root. In 2012, Swerdlick wrote for the New York Daily Newss election blog "The Rumble" and also freelanced for various newspapers and magazines. In 2015, he accepted a position as editor of The Washington Post. Swerdlick is married to Asila Calhoun. He is a frequent political commentator on CNN.

References

African-American journalists
American people of Jewish descent
CNN people
The Washington Post people